Szkice węglem is a 1957 Polish historical film directed by Antoni Bohdziewicz. It is based on a novel by Henryk Sienkiewicz.

References

External links
 

1957 films
Polish historical films
1950s Polish-language films
Films based on works by Henryk Sienkiewicz
1950s historical films